WWN may refer to:
 Wales West and North Television
 World Wide Name, a Fibre Channel, Serial ATA, and Serial Attached SCSI term
 World Without Nazism
 World Wrestling Network
 Weekly World News, a tabloid newspaper
 W. W. Norton, a book publishing company
 WWNLive
 Waterford Whispers News, an Irish satirical online news website
 World War N, also known as World War 0